Antonio Pio may refer to:

Antonio Pio (composer) (1753–1795), Italian composer
Antonio Pio (painter) (1809–1871), Italian painter